Pigeon Point Light Station or Pigeon Point Lighthouse is a lighthouse built in 1871 to guide ships on the Pacific coast of California. It is the tallest lighthouse (tied with Point Arena Light) on the West Coast of the United States. It is still an active Coast Guard aid to navigation. The , white masonry tower, resembles the typical New England structure.

The lighthouse and the land around have been preserved as Pigeon Point Light Station State Historic Park, a California state park. The lighthouse is also listed on the National Register of Historic Places, and designated as a California Historical Landmark. The lighthouse is currently undergoing major renovations funded by the California state legislature in 2021. Research published 2022 by the San Mateo County Office of Sustainability found that the lighthouse was vulnerable to erosion caused by sea level rise.

History

Pigeon Point Lighthouse is one of the most picturesque lighthouses on the Pacific coast. The tower stands on a rocky promontory and has long been a landmark for ships approaching San Francisco Bay from the south. This headland, and hence the lighthouse, took its name from the ship Carrier Pigeon that wrecked here in 1853.

The lantern room of the tower is no longer equipped with the original first-order, 1000-watt Fresnel lens. No longer illuminated for demonstration purposes, the lens has 24 flash panels, is composed of 1008 hand-polished lenses and prisms and is capable of producing over 500,000 candlepower illumination. It was manufactured by the Henry-LePaute company in Paris, France, and was first lit at Pigeon Point at sunset on November 15, 1872.

Originally the tower was equipped with a lamp that burned refined lard oil (pig fat).  In 1888, that lamp was replaced with a mineral oil (kerosene) lamp. To produce Pigeon Point's assigned characteristic of one white flash of light every ten seconds, the one ton lens rotated one time every four minutes. When observed from a distance, this resulted in the appearance of one white flash of light every ten seconds. The lens rotation was originally powered by a clockworks and  weight. In 1926 the lighthouse was provided with electricity. Modern innovations were incorporated and the kerosene IOV lamp was replaced by a 1000 watt bulb, the clockworks by an electric motor and an electrically operated fog signal was eventually installed.

The lighthouse has been designated California Historical Landmark number 930. In 1972, the United States Coast Guard mounted a  aerobeacon on the front of the tower (now replaced by a smaller beacon) and officially retired the Fresnel lens from regular duty. The First order Fresnel lens is no longer lit to celebrate special occasions, such as the annual lighting of the lens, which usually occurred in mid-November (closest Saturday to November 15) the date of the original first lighting in 1872. The lens was removed from the top of the tower in November 2011, to now be displayed in the fog signal building, adjacent to the base of the lighthouse. The light outside the lens room, mounted on a small verandah at the top of the  tower, rotating with six beams, is still an active aid to navigation.

The first order fresnel lens of the Pigeon Point Lighthouse originally came from the Cape Hatteras Lighthouse, which has the same lens characteristic. Following the deactivation of the original tower in 1870, the lens, which had only been installed in 1863 was removed and put into storage. Shortly thereafter in 1871 it was shipped to the west coast to be installed in the new lighthouse.

Renovation 
The tower has been closed to tours since December 2001 because of the collapse of brickwork supporting outside access metal walkways on the top of the structure. Cast iron was used rather than steel. Cast iron absorbs water rather than repelling it like steel, thus the walkways are severely rusted, as are the major binding ring bands at the base of the tower. The California State Park system has promised repairs, but it is estimated that even if funds were available, it would be seven to ten years before the repairs would be completed. In July, 2010, Rep. Anna G. Eshoo (D-Palo Alto) stated that of the $3.4 million she requested for her district through the Fiscal Year 2011 Interior and Environment Appropriations Act, $250,000 will be allocated to restore the upper portion of the lighthouse.

In 2021, an $18 million provision was made in the California state budget for the full restoration of the lighthouse.  The work is scheduled to take 18 months to complete.

Contemporary uses 
The restored lighthouse keepers' housing has, since the mid-1960s, also served as a youth hostel for travelers. The hostel is operated by HI USA, a nonprofit organization devoted to helping the young gain a greater understanding of the world and its people through hosteling.

The Pigeon Point Lighthouse is also a logo of the E. W. Scripps Company.

Image gallery

See also
 List of lighthouses in California
 List of lighthouses in the United States

References

Further reading

External links

 Pigeon Point Light Station State Historic Park
 Carrier Pigeon / CINMS Shipwreck Database
 Lighthouse Friends / Pigeon Point History
 Westkueste USA: Pigeon Point Lighthouse History and description of the Pigeon Point Lighthouse with pictures 

California State Historic Parks
History of San Mateo County, California
History of the San Francisco Bay Area
Lighthouses completed in 1871
Lighthouses in the San Francisco Bay Area
Lighthouses on the National Register of Historic Places in California
National Register of Historic Places in San Mateo County, California
Parks in San Mateo County, California
Protected areas established in 2000
Transportation buildings and structures in San Mateo County, California